Antología is the sixth album by the Chilean band Fiskales Ad-Hok taken in 2004 which was recorded for the first seven issues. Also item 12 is an extract from the "Raras tokatas nuevas" of Rock & Pop and item 18 is a live recording in "La Batuta". The CD featured video clip of "Fiesta" (item not found in the collection) and "La noche de las dueñas de casa vivientes". The theme "Resistiré" is a cover of the originally played by Dúo Dinámico on the album "En Forma".

Track listing
 Libertad Vigilada
 Los Malditos
 La Malda
 La noche de las dueñas de casa vivientes
 Ron Suicida
 Mierdamix 1 (Eugenia, El Circo, Perra, Tevito, Gris)
 Ángel
 Cuando muera
 Calavera
 Resistiré
 El patio con rejas en el cielo
 Mierdamix 2 (No estar aquí, Odio, Almorzando entre muertos, La cultura de la basura)
 Cóndor
 Campanitas
 Tan Fácil
 Rosa Negra
 Lorea Elvis
 Mierdamix 3 (Ten Piedad, Ponk, La Ranchera)
 Incoherencias
 Al Puerto
 Borracho

Personnel
Álvaro España - vocals
Guardabosques - guitar
Vibora - guitar
Micky - drums
Memo - drums
Roly Urzua - bass

Fiskales Ad-Hok albums
2004 albums
Spanish-language albums